"It's Cold Outside" is a song by the American garage rock band the Choir, written by the Choir's drummer, Dan Klawon, and first released on Canadian-American Records in September 1966. It is considered a classic of the musical genre of garage rock, and became the group's only national hit. The song has since been featured on several compilation albums.

Background
The Choir originally came to prominence in Cleveland under the moniker the Mods, covering a wide variety of material penned by British Invasion-based groups such as the Who, the Rolling Stones, and the Beatles. As the house band for the Painesville Armory, the group appeared on several local television programs, emulating a pop sound inspired by the songs they covered. By 1966, the band members developed into capable songwriters, writing the originals "It's Cold Outside" and "Going Home". With their freshly-penned material in hand, the Mods traveled to Chicago to record. Around the same time, the band changed their name to the Choir because the Modernaires were recording under the name "the Mods."

The song's lyrics pertain to a dejected recounting of a failed love affair, though the vocal delivery is conducted in a sunny manner. Klawon explains "I used to write quite a bit then, and one day I was thinking of some sort of theme to use with the moon/spoon, boy/girl lyrics," before deciding "to go with a weather analogy". Also evident are the soothing vocal harmonies and fast-paced rhythm guitar instrumentals, both reminiscent of early Beatles and Who compositions. In addition to the British Invasion-influenced arrangements, "It's Cold Outside" is also marked by Dave Burke's raving bass playing and lead guitarist Wally Bryson's jangling Byrds-esque technique. Music historian Richie Unterberger, writing for the Allmusic website, proposes the tune would have been better suited for "the innocent times of 1964 than for the complicated culture and music scene of 1967".

Chart performance
Upon its release in September 1966, "It's Cold Outside" drew little attention. However, in April 1967 the single was re-issued on Roulette Records and went to No. 1 on all three Top 40 radio stations in Cleveland, retaining the position for five weeks. Nationally, the record peaked at No. 49 in Record World, No. 55 in Cash Box and No. 68 on the Billboard Hot 100. "It's Cold Outside" gained more attention from garage rock enthusiasts years later when it was compiled on Pebbles, Volume 2 and the 1998 reissue of Nuggets: Original Artyfacts from the First Psychedelic Era, 1965–1968. Other albums that feature the song include Psychedelic Microdots, Volume 3, Choir Practice, and Trash Box.

Later uses
"It's Cold Outside" was included on the Raspberries Pop Art Live CD set from their reunion concert recording, November 26, 2004, at the House of Blues in Cleveland, Ohio, released August 18, 2017.

Chart history

Other versions
 In 1976, the power-pop band Tattoo released a cover version of the song as a B-side opener on their self-titled album.
 In 1979, Stiv Bators of Dead Boys and The Lords of the New Church released a cover version of the song as a single A-side.
 In 1987, Hard-Ons covered the song on a compilation album "Hot For Your Love, Baby".
 In 1990, the Finnish punk rock collaboration  covered the song with original Finnish lyrics titled "Vaikka kylmää on" on their three-song Christmas seven inch "Kaikki Uskoo Joulupukkiin."  

References

External links
 Lyrics of this song
 

1966 songs
1967 debut singles